Mahar, meaning "original inhabitants of Maharashtra" (in various languages), is an Indian caste found largely in the state of Maharashtra and neighbouring areas. Most of the Mahar community followed B. R. Ambedkar in converting to Buddhism in the middle of the 20th century. As of 2017 the Mahar caste was designated as a Scheduled Caste in 16 Indian states.

History
Historically Mahar had the role of defending village borders from outsiders, invading tribes and protecting villagers from criminals and thieves. They were also responsible for maintaining "law and order" throughout the villages in the capacity of administrators From the time of early Islamic rule, villages in Maharashtra were part of the Baluta system. In that system, different castes were assigned different roles, each with its own tasks and rights. In the Baluta system, apart from many traditional duties, the Mahar were assigned work of removing dead cows from the village. The community also started eating flesh of cows that had died naturally, and the eating of beef formed the basis for the caste being treated as untouchables. The Mahar community defends consumption of beef by saying the famines were the reason they started eating the beef. However, they were socio-economically well above most other untouchable groups because their traditional role had been important in the village administrative system, had necessitated that they had at least a rudimentary education, and frequently brought them into contact with upper-caste Hindus.

The Mahars are considered original inhabitants of Maharashtra. The community is also known as "Kathiwale" (Men with sticks), Bumiputera (Sons of the Soil), and Mirasi (Landlords). The "Kathiwale" name represents their former duty as Administrators. They lived in village land they once ruled to the east, but in separate settlements. Historically Mahar were Landlords or Vatandar, and over a period of time they turned into Balutedar, whose duties in the Baluta system included those of village watchmen, trackers of thieves, messengers, wall menders, adjudicators of boundary disputes, and suppliers of coarse cloth to the village. In return for these services, the village granted them a watan, or rights to small piece of land to do their own cultivation. The watan also included a share of village produce. They also worked at times as agricultural labourers.

Islamic Era
Under Islamic rule, Mahar served as soldiers in various armies of the Deccan Sultanates, Bahmani Sultanate, and the Mughals.

In 14th century, Mahar Bhakti saint Chokhamela, and many of his family members such as Karmamela, Banka, Nirmala, and Soyarabai became popular for their religious poetry called abhang.

Maratha era
Mahar served in various armies over several centuries. The Maratha king Shivaji Maharaj recruited a number of them into his army in the 17th century due to their loyalty and bravery. They served as guards in hill forts and as soldiers. The Mahar along with the Koli and Marathas defended the fort of Purandar from Dilirkhan's Moghul army in 1665. Later during Peshwa rule Shidnak mahar saved the life of his commander Parshurambhau Patwardhan during the Battle of Kharda in 1795.

The Mahar were subjected to degradation during the rule of the Peshwas, who treated them as untouchables. Anthropologist Traude Pillai-Vetschera at the University of Vienna states that during the Peshwa rule in the capital city Poona they were subjected to extreme restrictions such as wearing an earthen pot to prevent defilement of the ground due their spit, as well as restrictions due to defilement by their shadow and footprints.

British India

Under British rule, the Mahars became aware of the scope for social and political advancement. Their traditional role had been low-status but important in the village system.

In the mid-20th century, the Mahar gave up their traditional jobs to a large extent in rural Maharashtra, and took employment in the urban mills, docks, construction sites and railways. They created a receptive body of urban workers who were ready to join a political movement for higher status and equality.

Military role under the British

During the colonial period, large numbers of Mahars and dhors were recruited for military duties by the East India Company and the British Raj. The Battle of Koregaon (1 January 1818) is commemorated by an obelisk known as the Koregaon pillarwhich was erected at the site of the battleand by a medal issued in 1851. The pillar featured on the Mahar Regiment crest until the Independence of India; it is inscribed with the names of 22 Mahars killed at the battle. The victory pillar serves as focal point of Mahar heroism.

The Mahar began their service to the East India company around 1750. 20-25% of the British Bombay Army was Mahar. Their conduct as soldiers was praised by many British officers. Mahars were a vital component of the British Marine Battalion. In the East India Company Army they participated in various wars including Second Anglo-Maratha War, Third Anglo-Maratha War, Second Anglo-Sikh War and Second Afghan War.

After the 1857 mutiny, the British decided to change their military recruitment policy  One report "emphasized that we cannot practically ignore it (the caste system), so long as the natives socially maintain it". This led to the discrimination against the Mahars, other low-caste and some unreliable Brahmin castes.

Mahar recruitment reached its nadir in the early 1890s (sources differ as to exact year) when British in favour of "martial races," specially north-western communities halted recruitment of Mahars. The Mahar community attempted to confront this block with a petition circulated among the Mahar, Chamar, and Mang former soldiersall Marathi-speaking lower castesbut the movement was unable to organise and submit their petition. The attempt at a challenge had been spearheaded by Gopal Baba Walangkar, himself a Mahar, dhor and former soldier, but he found that Mahar military pensioners were unwilling to sign because they feared that they might lose their pensions. Thus, by the beginning of World War I, there were few Mahars left in the Army.

A Mahar regiment was created during World War I but only for a few years and because of British desperation for additional troops. In 1941, the Mahar Regiment proper was created.

Mahatma Jyotirao Phule
In 1873, Jyotirao Phule, the founder of Satyashodhak Samajwhich aimed to abolish religious slaveryorganised Mahars. At that time, Mahars were not allowed to enter Hindu temples and were considered unclean. Even their entry into the shrines of Hindu gods was restricted. Their first conference was held in Mumbai in 1903.

Shahu of Kolhapur
Shahu, the ruler of the princely state of Kolhapur, abolished Mahar watan in 1918 and freed the Mahars in his territory from the slavery imposed by the society of the day. He also gave them all the human rights and equality that others enjoy.

Demographics
In 1969, the Mahars constituted about 70% of the total Scheduled Caste population and also represented about 9% of population of the state of Maharashtra.
Mahar is numerically the largest Scheduled Caste in Maharashtra, according to the 2001 Census of India.
, the Mahar community was designated as a Scheduled Caste (SC) in 16 Indian states, being: Andhra Pradesh, Arunachal Pradesh Assam, Chhattisgarh, Dadra and Nagar Haveli, Daman and Diu, Goa, Gujarat, Karnataka, Madhya Pradesh, Maharashtra, Rajasthan, Telangana, West Bengal and Haryana.

Culture and Social stratification

Historically Mahar had "12 and half" endogamous subcastes, major subcastes include Somavanshi, Ladvanshi (derived from "Lata Pradesh" current Gujarat), Andhavanshi, Tilvanshi, Bawane (Bhavani Mahar),Gondvanshi, Suryavanshi, Kadvanshi and Kosare etc. These subcaste names are not totemistic. 
Some of the subcaste names represent the territory they controlled or occupied and other subcaste names represent the acts their founders did. The Somavanshi Mahar trace their descent (bloodline) from Mahabharata's Pandava. The Somavanshi Mahar claim to have taken part in Mahabharata war and subsequently settled in Maharashtra. Before converting to Buddhism these subcastes would not marry and eat with one another.

The Mahars of the Deccan speak a non-standard version of Marathi. When a Mahar meets a man of his own caste a he says Namastu, and when he meets anyone other than a Mahar he says Johar, said to be from the Sanskrit Yoddhar (Warrior). The Mahars belonging to different regions can't intermarry unless there is some family connection can be traced between them. The Mahars are divided into number of exogamous groups or clans or kuls. There are enough evidences found to conclude that each of the exogamous group historically owned and worshipped Devak or Totem and it is brought into prominence at the time of marriage ceremony. Members of families with a common Devak cannot intermarry.
 

 
In most of the cases Devak became obsolete and it is replaced with composite Devak called Panchpalvi composed of the leaves, of five trees. 
Few examples of Panchpalvi are,
Khandesh
Arkathi
Borkathi
Jambul
Mango
Ruchkin
Poona 
Mango 
Pipal 
Rui 
Shami 
Umbar

Dalit literature
According to Eleanor Zelliot, Dalit literature originated in Marathi-speaking areas of Maharashtra. She credits Dr. Babasaheb Ambedkar, a Mahar himself, for inspiring many Dalit writers. Baburao Bagul (1930–2008), Shankarrao Kharat, and Bandhu Madhav were early Marathi writers from the Mahar community. The Mahar writer Namdeo Dhasal (who founded Dalit Panther) was significant in the Dalit movement. Other notable Mahar authors writing in Marathi include Shantabai Kamble, Urmila Pawar, Raja Dhale, Daya Pawar, and Narendra Jadhav.

Religion

Hinduism
Before their conversion to Buddhism, the important deities of Mahar were Shiva, Khandoba, Vithoba and the varkari saints, Chokhamela, and Dnyaneshwar. Family deities of Mahars are typically Shiva, Maridevi, Bhumidevi, Navanathas and Bhavani. The Nag or king cobra was particularly revered by the community.

Christianity

In the late 19th century, Otto Weishaupt's attempts to evangelise in the Sangamner area of Ahmadnagar district met with little success with communities such as the Brahmins, Muslims and Bhils, but his efforts to promote Christianity did appeal to the Mahars there. There were also some Mahar converts to Christianity in other areas of Ahmednagar district around the early 20th century.

Buddhism

The Christian conversion movement became overshadowed by the emergence of B. R. Ambedkar's Buddhist equivalent. When he converted to Buddhism at Nagpur in 1956, many Mahars were among those of his followers who chose to do the same. As Buddhists, they gave up their traditional Hindu occupations and sought to redefine their social status. Ambedkar died about two months after this mass conversion. At the same spot, after his cremation, more Mahars were converted to Buddhism. Now, this community is the third most populous in Mumbai.

Some Buddhist leaders among the population prefer that the term Mahar no longer be applied to these converts. Buddhism appealed to the sense of equality for the Mahars; an intellectual of Mahar origin said, "I have accepted Buddhist doctrine. I am Buddhist now. I am not Mahar now, not untouchable nor even Hindu. I have become a human being".

In a 1996 book, authors De and Shastree claimed that it has been difficult for the Neo-buddhists to totally abandon the rituals, practices, and festivals of their old Hindu religion. Although one of the early buddhist convert, V R Ranpise had written a book in Marathi called Boudha Samskar Path in 1962 as a guide to his fellow converts, very few had read the book.

Footnotes

References

Further reading
 

 
Buddhist communities of India
Dalit communities
Scheduled Castes of Andhra Pradesh
Scheduled Castes of Assam
Scheduled Castes of Chhattisgarh
Scheduled Castes of Dadra and Nagar Haveli
Scheduled Castes of Daman and Diu
Scheduled Castes of Goa
Scheduled Castes of Gujarat
Scheduled Castes of Karnataka
Scheduled Castes of Madhya Pradesh
Scheduled Castes of Maharashtra
Scheduled Castes of Meghalaya
Scheduled Castes of Mizoram
Scheduled Castes of Rajasthan
Scheduled Castes of Telangana
Scheduled Castes of West Bengal